Orthogonius niger is a species of ground beetle in the subfamily Orthogoniinae. It was described by Jedlicka in 1935.

References

niger
Beetles described in 1935